The Gainsboro Branch of the Roanoke City Public Library, also known as the Gainsboro Library, is a historic library building located in the African-American neighborhood of Gainsboro in Northwest Roanoke, Virginia.  It was built in 1941–1942, and is a one-story, seven-bay, L-plan Tudor Revival style brick building.  The library provided African-American residents of Roanoke's segregated Gainsboro neighborhood with a library facility where children and adults could pursue self-education with advice and assistance from competent and dedicated librarians. It replaced Roanoke's first African-American library which had been established in 1921 in a rented commercial storefront space. 

Land for the new building was purchased from St. Andrew's Catholic Church. "...Mrs. Lee asked Father Thomas of St. Andrew's Catholic Church (Roanoke, Virginia) about leasing church land in the Gainsboro area for a library. He didn't have the authority to do that himself, but instead helped Mrs. Virginia Dare Young Lee draft a letter to Pope Pius XII in Rome (Vatican City) about the matter. The Pope's response was beyond all expectations. Land was granted "...for ninety-nine years for the use of the Public Library."

The deep slate roof and large bay windows give the library building a home-like appearance, as does the high ceilings and large rooms. It almost has a Gingerbread house appearance.

It was listed on the National Register of Historic Places in 1996, and is part of the Gainsboro Historic District. It underwent significant renovations in 2009 and 2020.

References

African-American history of Virginia
Libraries on the National Register of Historic Places in Virginia
Tudor Revival architecture in Virginia
Library buildings completed in 1942
Buildings and structures in Roanoke, Virginia
National Register of Historic Places in Roanoke, Virginia
Individually listed contributing properties to historic districts on the National Register in Virginia
1942 establishments in Virginia